The Special Operations Forces Cold Weather Maritime Training Facility, Naval Special Warfare Cold Weather Detachment Kodiak is a United States Navy base near Kodiak, Alaska used to train United States Navy SEALs. The training includes cold weather survival and advanced tactical training in forested, coastal environments. The base covers 55 acres on Spruce Cape and training is conducted throughout the surrounding area and nearby Long Island.

As of November 2008, six SEAL classes averaging 40 students come to Kodiak each year for a 28-day course. The trainees are sent to Kodiak after completing Basic Underwater Demolition/SEAL (BUD/S) selection and before they are assigned to their respective SEAL teams.

References

Buildings and structures in Kodiak Island Borough, Alaska
Military installations in Alaska
Naval medicine
Thermal medicine
United States Navy installations
United States Naval Special Warfare Command
1987 establishments in Alaska